Funtasia is a chain of entertainment facilities in Ireland. Funtasia operates an indoor and outdoor family entertainment centre in Bettystown as well as a water park in Drogheda.

Funtasia Bettystown
Funtasia Bettystown is located in Bettystown, Co. Meath. There are numerous indoor as well as outdoor attractions. Indoor attractions include bumper cars, a monorail, bowling, arcade games and pool tables. Outdoor attractions include a small roller coaster and a drop ride. There is also a casino.

Funtasia Waterpark Drogheda
Funtasia Waterpark includes a pirate themed water park and an Egyptian themed indoor entertainment centre. The water park features numerous activities, of which the main attraction is the Super-Bowl speed slide and the Boomerang. Other attractions include bowling, a play area, crazy golf and rock climbing. There is also a casino. Funtasia have recently launched an online version of their casino.

See also
 Aquazone

References

External links
 Official site
 Funtasia online casino

Amusement parks in Ireland
Tourist attractions in County Meath
Tourist attractions in County Louth
Water parks in Ireland
Drogheda